X-Man is a pornographic video game made for the Atari 2600 by Universal Gamex, designed by Alan Roberts and programmed by H. K. Poon. It was released in 1983. The game is unrelated to the similarly named Marvel comic book series entitled X-Men.

It is the only title made by Universal Gamex. It had faced protest from women's groups when it was first released, and most retailers declined to carry the game or if they did, buyers had to be at least 18 years old to purchase the game, or it was kept under-the-counter. It could also be purchased via mail order, and an advertisement inviting such purchases appeared in at least one gaming magazine; a full-page example can be found in the July 1983 issue of Videogaming Illustrated.

Gameplay 
In the game, the player controls a naked man in a labyrinth. The objective is to reach the door at the center of the labyrinth avoiding scissors, crabs or teeth. Clearing the challenge, the player enters a bonus stage simulating a sexual intercourse between the man and a woman.

References

External links 
X-Man at Atari Mania
X-Man  at AtariAge

1983 video games
Atari 2600 games
Atari 2600-only games
Erotic Atari 2600 games
North America-exclusive video games
Video games developed in the United States